Conanalus is an Asian genus of bush crickets in the tribe Conocephalini, of the 'conehead' subfamily Conocephalinae.

Species
The Orthoptera Species File lists:
Conanalus axinus Shi, Wang & Fu, 2005
Conanalus bilobus Du, Song & Shi, 2015
Conanalus brevicaudus Shi, Mao & Ou, 2008
Conanalus pieli Tinkham, 1943 - type species (locality: Jiangxi, Kuling, China)
Conanalus plicipennis Xia & Liu, 1990
Conanalus robustus Shi, Mao & Ou, 2008

References

External links 
 

Conocephalinae
Tettigoniidae genera
Orthoptera of Asia